Edward Gary George (born August 10, 1946) is a former offensive lineman and star player in the Canadian Football League (CFL).

CFL
Ed George was drafted in the fourth round of the 1970 NFL Draft by the Pittsburgh Steelers after playing at Wake Forest University, but opted to go to the Canadian Football League. George played left offensive tackle from 1970 to 1972 and left offensive guard from 1973 to 1974 for the Montreal Alouettes, finishing his career with the Hamilton Tiger-Cats from 1979 to 1980. George won two Grey Cups with the Alouettes, in 1970 and 1974, led by head coaches Sam Etcheverry and Marv Levy, respectively. He also played but lost in another for the Tiger-Cats in 1980.

For his tremendous blocking abilities on both running and passing plays as guard and tackle and despite only seven years of play, George was inducted into the Canadian Football Hall of Fame in 2005.

NFL
George played in 1975 for the Baltimore Colts and from 1976-1978 for the Philadelphia Eagles of the National Football League.

Family
His daughter Courtney worked for Speed TV doing NASCAR coverage in 2004.

1946 births
Living people
American football offensive linemen
American players of Canadian football
Baltimore Colts players
Canadian Football Hall of Fame inductees
Canadian football offensive linemen
Hamilton Tiger-Cats players
Montreal Alouettes players
Players of Canadian football from Norfolk, Virginia
Players of American football from Norfolk, Virginia
Philadelphia Eagles players
Wake Forest Demon Deacons football players